Radical Reformists and Social Fighters for a Fairer Society (ROSSEM) is a Belgian libertarian political party founded in 1991 by the Flemish businessman and writer Jean-Pierre Van Rossem. There was an active French-speaking section in the Walloon Brabant with the acronym ROSSUM (Rassemblement omniprésent social et solidaire pour l'ubiquité des masses).

History

1991 Elections
The party participated in the 24 November 1991 elections for the Belgian national parliament. It scored surprisingly well for a non-mainstream party, achieving 3.2% of the vote which entitled it to three seats in the lower house and one in the senate.

Initially, Van Rossem could not take up his seat as he was arrested a few days before the elections following allegations of financial fraud. He was eventually sworn in on 7 January 1992.

Dissidences
In 1993 Van Rossem courted controversy by shouting “Vive la république d'Europe, vive Julien Lahaut!” during King Albert II's oath ceremony following his succession to the throne. Later that year, the party collapsed due to infighting amongst its members, and did not contest the next election.
There were three dissidences.

This dissidence, and its French-speaking section (BANANE) are generally considered as the successors of ROSSEM because Jean-Pierre Van Rossem gave them his support.

It is interesting to note that the anti-Van Rossem economically libertarian members of the party also grouped together in the Blanco list, led by Marcel Van der Vloet, that participated in the 1995 elections before joining the Vlaams Blok. This was a populist list that insisted on voting "against all" by voting for them.

After 1995
In the 1995 elections, the different splits of ROSSEM participated in the elections. 
At the federal level, WOW made 0.41% while BANAAN made 0.66% and Blanco 0.04%. Both parties were present in all Flemish constituencies, Blanco was only present in the Brussels-Hal-Vilvoorde constituency. For the Senate, WOW made 0.55%, BANAAN 0.53% and HOERA 0.35%.

WOW had a program very close to that of the Vlaams Blok, Blanco was a populist big-tent party, while BANAAN and HOERA were satirical left-wing parties.

These different parties also participated in the Flemish regional election. WOW scored 1.4%, BANAAN 0.89% and HOERA 0.4%. All three parties were present in all constituencies. 
Finally, BANAAN participated in the regional election of Brussels-Capital in the French-speaking college (under the name BANANE) by making a result of 0.61%.

In 1999, BANANE (French-speaking section of BANAAN) still existed for the elections under the name of Tarte. WOW suffered a major electoral defeat that year leading to a merger with the Vlaams Blok, BANAAN joined the young Vivant party and HOERA ceased to exist.

ROSSEM 2
In 2009, Jean-Pierre Van Rossem wanted to re-found his party under the name Partij van de Toekomst but the name ROSSEM remained because it was much more familiar.
In 2012 ROSSEM announced his intention to take part in the Antwerp municipal elections. Van Rossem dropped this plan, however, because his party was not sufficiently prepared.

In 2013, Nora Azdad was elected President of ROSSEM.
Van Rossem wanting to create the party program in the shadow. He also tried to create a joint list for the 2014 elections with the Workers' Party of Belgium and Libertair, Direct, Democratisch but they refused. Jean-Marie Dedecker (LDD) did not want to join forces with either Van Rossem or the PvDA, and Peter Mertens (PvDA) did not want to risk losing the possibility of getting a Flemish elected representative as predicted by the polls, but he did not totally reject the idea either.

In 2014, it suffered a heavy defeat in the Federal (0.17% at national level but 0.3% at Flemish level) and Flemish regional (0.24%) elections.

Electoral results
The results given here are those of ROSSEM-ROSSUM (1991 and 2014), BANAAN-BANANE (1995) and Tarte (1999).

Chamber of Representatives

Senate

Regional

Brussels Parliament

Flemish Parliament

References

External links
 vub.ac.be

Political parties in Belgium
Libertarian parties
Political parties established in 1991
1991 establishments in Belgium
Syncretic political movements